Jam is a river in central India originating in the Betul District of Madhya Pradesh.It flows through several villages and towns during its short run, ultimately draining itself off in Kanhan River. This confluence is located at the border with Maharashtra. An ambitious water project in the form of a dam has been proposed by Maharashtra in anticipation of the growing water needs of metro Nagpur. However the project has been shelved for now due to lack of co-operation from the state government in Madhya Pradesh.A gotmar fair (stone Througing on one village to another) is also organized every year on its bank.

Origin
The river originates through a convergence of several rivulets and streams flowing down the hill slopes situated around Chilhati village in the Betul District in Madhya Pradesh at an altitude of 762m.

Course
Snaking along south east the river enters the Chhindwara District and hits flatter terrain where it collects two rivers, each of them being spill offs from dams. The first one is the overflow stream from an earthen dam located near Mandvi. The other, longer of the two streams, flows out from the Borgaon Dam, runs parallel to NH69, and merges with Jam river at Teegaon. Here the river widens out and continues its run southeast of the town receiving another tributary on its left bank near the village Chichkheda. It travels through the outskirts of the town Pandhura changing course to run in an eastward fashion. Just before reaching the village Jam, it receives its largest tributary River Sarpini. From here the river again flows southeast-ward passing the town Lodhikheda and ends its course by draining off in Kanhan River at Razadi Borgaon, Madhya Pradesh.

References

Rivers of Madhya Pradesh
Rivers of India